Orlando Rossardi (born September 5, 1938) is a Cuban poet, playwright and a researcher in Latin American literature.

Biography
Orlando Rossardi (pseudonym of Orlando Rodríguez Sardiñas) was born in Havana, Cuba in 1938. He left the island in 1960, and has since been living in Spain and in the United States.

Orlando Rodríguez Sardiñas obtained a Ph.D. at the University of Texas, Austin, and taught at the University of New Hampshire, Wisconsin and Miami Dade College in Florida.

He began working in 1984 for Radio Martí in Washington, D.C, and later at their office in Miami, FL, as programming coordinator and subsequently deputy director, dedicating twenty years of his life to the broadcasting services of the United States Government.

Orlando Rossardi published primarily poetry and his collections include El Diámetro y lo Estero (1964), Que voy de vuelo (1970), Los espacios llenos (1991), Memoria de mí (1996), Los pies en la tierra (2006), Libro de las pérdidas (2008), Casi la voz (2009), Canto en la Florida (2010), Fundación del centro (2011) y Totalidad (2012).

His anthology, La última poesía cubana (1973), is considered by critics the first major work bringing together the Cuban poets both from the island and from exile.

His other works include six volumes of Historia de la Literatura Hispanoamericana Contemporánea (1976) the three volumes on Teatro Selecto Hispanoamericano Contemporáneo (1971), as well as an essay on the Colombian avant garde poet León de Greiff: una poética de vanguardia (1974).

Rossardi is a member of the North American Academy of the Spanish Language (Academia Norteamericana de la Lengua Española) and Correspondent of the Royal Academy of the Spanish Language in Madrid, Spain. His research contributions can be found in encyclopedias, dictionaries, and literary magazines in Spain and Latin America as well as in the United States.

Works
Poetry
 Obra Selecta (Valencia, 2019)
 Tras los rostros (Valencia, 2017)
 Palabra afuera (Valencia, 2015)
 Totalidad (Valencia, 2012)
 Fundación del centro (Valencia, 2011)
 Canto en la Florida (Valencia, 2010)
 Casi la voz (Valencia, 2009)
 Libro de las pérdidas (Valencia, 2008)
 Los pies en la tierra (Madrid, 2006)
 Memoria de mí (Madrid, 1996)
 Los espacios llenos (Madrid, 1991)
 La última poesía cubana (Madrid, 1973)
 Que voy de vuelo (Madrid, 1970)
 El diametro y lo estero (Madrid, 1964)

Theater
 La visita (Virginia, 1997)
 Teatro Selecto Hispanoamericano Contemporáneo, 3 volumes,(Madrid, 1973)

Essays
 Gabriela Mistral y los Estados Unidos (New York, 2011)
 Historia de la literatura hispanoamericano, 6 volumes, (Madrid, 1976)
 León de Greiff: una poética de vanguardia (Madrid, 1973)

Cuadernos monográficos
 Dossier Orlando Rossardi (La Gota de Agua, Philaadelphia, 2018)

References

Further reading

 "Identidad y estética de pertenencia en la poesía de Orlando Rossardi" by Joaquín Badajoz (en Totalidad: 13-26)
 Ensayos literarios: "El lirismo vital de Orlando Rossardi en Los pies en la tierra" by Yara González Montes (Plaza Editorial, 2014, Tomo I, EE.UU.: 164-176)
 Analogía de la prosa poética de Joaquín Badajoz en la poesía de Orlando Rossardi by Martha Salazar Quintero (XXXIV Congreso Cultural de Verano del Círculo de Cultura Panamericano, Miami, 25 a 27 de julio, 2014)
 Retórica del deseo inextinguible y de la combustión certera en Los pies en la tierra de Orlando Rossardi by Jorge Chen Sham (Primer Congreso de la Academia Norteamericana de la Lengua Española, Washington, D.C. Library of Congress, 6 a 8 de junio, 2014)
 Releyendo a Rossardi by Medeline Cámara (Especial / El Nuevo Herald. Artes y Letras, 4 D, Miami, Domingo 24 de febrero, 2013)
 La conciencia del arte poetizador en Orlando Rossardi by Rodolfo de Gracia Reynaldo (Revista Lotería, 2013, Panamá, Mayo-Junio, pp 88–96)
 “Patria y exilio en la poesia de Orlando Rossardi” by Joaquín Gálvez, (Hypermedia, magazine, September 30, 2020)

External links
 Teatro selecto contemporáneo hispanoamericano - Escelicer, 1971
 Presentación Libro de las Pérdidas - Orlando Rossardi Sardiñas en el Centro Cultural Español en Miami, 2008.

1938 births
Cuban male poets
People from Havana
Writers from Havana
20th-century Cuban poets
Living people
20th-century male writers